Yellow Sands may refer to:

 Yellow Sands (play)
 Yellow Sands (film)
 Members of the Yellow Sand Society, a Chinese secret society

See also
 "Come Unto These Yellow Sands", a song in Shakespeare's play The Tempest